The Dirty Story: The Best of Ol' Dirty Bastard is a greatest hits album by Ol' Dirty Bastard.

Track listing
"Shimmy Shimmy Ya"
"Brooklyn Zoo"
"Got Your Money" feat. Kelis
"Dirty Dancin'" feat. Method Man
"Raw Hide" feat. Method Man, Raekwon
"Protect Ya Neck II The Zoo" feat. 12 O'Clock, 60 Second Assassin, Buddha Monk, Killah Priest, Murdoc, Prodigal Sunn, Shorty Shit Stain, Zu Keeper
"Recognize" feat. Chris Rock
"Cold Blooded"
"Fantasy (Remix)" feat. Mariah Carey
"I Can't Wait"
"Good Morning Heartache" feat. Lil' Mo

References

Ol' Dirty Bastard albums
2001 greatest hits albums